With most of the senior nations preparing for the World Cup, FIRA organised a "Women ENC XV a side Tournament" for the six leading nations who were not in the Six Nations. While it does not appear to be part of the Women's European Championship sequence, it was very similar to the European Championship, especially the Pool B competitions.

Pool T1

Final table

Results

Pool T2

Final table

Results

Semi-finals

Final

Ranking matches

See also 
 Women's international rugby union

External links 
 FIRA website

2006
2006 rugby union tournaments for national teams
International women's rugby union competitions hosted by Italy
2005–06 in Italian rugby union
2006 in Italian women's sport
2005–06 in European women's rugby union